South Wosera Rural LLG is a local-level government (LLG) of East Sepik Province, Papua New Guinea.

Wards
01. Jikinangu
02. Tiendikum
03. Miko 1
04. Konambandu
05. Konambandu 3
06. Tukwokum
07. Apusit
08. Nala
09. Kunjingini
10. Mul
11. Waikamoko
12. Rubukum
13. Gwaiwaru
14. Moundu
15. Kamge
16. Patigo
17. Serangwandu
18. Palgerr
19. Nangda
20. Mikau
21. Wambisa
22. Kuanjoma
23. Pukago
24. Jipmako
25. Nungwaiko
26. Kwalget
27. Apambi
28. Gupmapil

References

Local-level governments of East Sepik Province